Events in the year 1225 in Norway.

Incumbents
Monarch: Haakon IV Haakonsson

Events

Arts and literature

Births

Deaths
7 November – Nicholas Arnesson, bishop (born c. 1150).

References

Norway